The Oskélanéo River is a tributary of the South Bay of Bureau Lake (Gouin Reservoir), flowing into the town of La Tuque, in the administrative region of Mauricie, in Quebec, in Canada.

The Oskélanéo River runs successively in the cantons of Faucher and Achintre. Forestry is the main economic activity of this valley; recreational tourism activities, second.

The route 404, connecting the village of Clova, Quebec to the South Bay of Bureau Lake (Gouin Reservoir) serves the lower part of the Oskélanéo River; this road connects to the south-east the route 400 which goes to Gouin Dam. Some secondary forest roads are in use nearby for forestry and recreational tourism activities.

The surface of the Oskélanéo River is usually frozen from mid-November to the end of April, however, safe ice circulation is generally from early December to the end of March.

History 
Thanks to the arrival of the Transcontinental Railway around 1910, Oskelaneo River Station contributed to the development of the village of Oskélanéo. The main economic activity was forestry. Nevertheless, recreational tourism activities developed rapidly, notably with the first raising of the Gouin Reservoir level in 1918, then the second raising in 1948. Given the current level of water in the lake, the village of Oskélanéo offers access to boating a direct access road to Gouin Reservoir down the Oskélanéo River. In the past, prior to the development of motorized forest roads, travelers were getting off the train at the Oskelaneo River station and using the services of outfitters for hunting and fishing trips.

Geography

Toponymy 
Until 1918, when the erection of the La Loutre Central, which will create the first level designated then Gouin Reservoir, the Oskélanéo River was considered to be one of the tributaries of the Saint-Maurice River), feeding the Bureau Lake (Gouin Reservoir).

This hydronym appears in cartographic documents at least since the first half of the 19th century, i.e. on the map of Charles Magnus (1857), in the form of Oskelanaio, then that of Eugène Taché in 1870. In 1914, this river was designated Escalana by Eugène Rouillard and on maps in particular in 1935. The designation "Escalona" is also indicated on maps of 1924 and 1926. Escalana (or Escalona) derives from oskélanéo which is an Algonquin word meaning "bones".

Nevertheless, some sources consider that oskélanéo results from the deformation and fusion of the words tchiask, meaning "gull", and sakegane, meaning "lake"; consequently, this hydronym would be translated as "gull lake" or "gull flight". In Atikamekw, the Oskélanéo River becomes  "Kiackoranan Sipi", meaning "river of the gull caught in the net". One [Canadian National] railway station has been designated "Oskelaneo River". The term "Oskelaneo", alone, was the name of a post office (1921-1973) serving what is now a hamlet.

The toponym "Oskélanéo River" was formalized on December 5, 1968 at the Commission de toponymie du Québec, when it was created.

Notes and references

See also 

Rivers of Mauricie
Tributaries of the Saint-Maurice River
La Tuque, Quebec